Lorenzo Díaz de Encinas, O. Carm. (1599–1660) was a Roman Catholic prelate who served as Bishop of Ugento (1659–1660).

Biography
Lorenzo Díaz de Encinas was born in Toledo, Spain in 1599 and ordained a priest in the Order of the Brothers of the Blessed Virgin Mary of Mount Carmel.
On 18 November 1657, he was selected as Bishop of Ugento and confirmed by Pope Alexander VII on 28 July 1659.
On 17 August 1659, he was consecrated bishop by Marcantonio Franciotti, Cardinal-Priest of Santa Maria della Pace, with Stefano Quaranta, Archbishop of Amalfi, and Francisco Suárez de Villegas, Titular Bishop of Memphis, serving as co-consecrators. 
He served as Bishop of Ugento until his death on 23 November 1660.

References

External links and additional sources
 (for Chronology of Bishops) 
 (for Chronology of Bishops) 

17th-century Italian Roman Catholic bishops
Bishops appointed by Pope Alexander VII
People from Toledo, Spain
1599 births
1660 deaths
Carmelite bishops